Jo Yi-jin (born Jo Bo-hyun on December 26, 1982) is a South Korean actress. She is best known for the films The Aggressives (2005) and Over the Border (2006).

Filmography

Film

Television series

Music video

Awards and nominations

References

External links
 Jo Yi-jin blog at Naver 
 Jo Yi-jin fan cafe at Daum 
 
 
 

1982 births
Living people
South Korean television actresses
South Korean film actresses